"Traffic" is the fourth single released by Welsh rock band Stereophonics. It is taken from their debut album, Word Gets Around (1997), and was released on 27 October 1997. The song reached number 20 on the UK Singles Chart and number 21 in Iceland.

Track listing
All music was composed by Kelly Jones, Richard Jones, and Stuart Cable. All lyrics were written by Kelly Jones.

CD 1
 "Traffic" (radio edit) – 4:25
 "Tie Me Up Tie Me Down" – 2:15
 "Chris Chambers" – 3:41
 "Traffic" (album version) – 4:53

CD 2 Live Festival EP
 "Traffic"
 "More Life in a Tramp's Vest"
 "A Thousand Trees"
 "Local Boy in the Photograph"
All tracks recorded live at Belfort France

7-inch vinyl
 "Traffic"
 "Tie Me Up Tie Me Down"
Same track listing for cassette single.

Charts

Other versions
 A live version was on the band's first live album, Live from Dakota.
 Another live version was included on the single "The Bartender and the Thief".
 The song is also performed on the Live at Cardiff Castle and Live at Morfa Stadium. The video can be found on the Call Us What You Want But Don't Call Us in the Morning DVD.

References

1997 singles
1997 songs
Songs written by Kelly Jones
Stereophonics songs
V2 Records singles